Niti Piyapan (born 20 June 1972) is a Thai sprinter. He competed in the men's 4 × 100 metres relay at the 1992 Summer Olympics.

References

1972 births
Living people
Athletes (track and field) at the 1992 Summer Olympics
Niti Piyapan
Niti Piyapan
Place of birth missing (living people)
Asian Games medalists in athletics (track and field)
Niti Piyapan
Athletes (track and field) at the 1998 Asian Games
Medalists at the 1998 Asian Games
Niti Piyapan
Southeast Asian Games medalists in athletics
Niti Piyapan